Skulduggery Pleasant: Playing with Fire is a young adult and fantasy novel written by Irish playwright Derek Landy, published in April 2008. It is the second of the Skulduggery Pleasant series and sequel to the novel of the same name.

The story follows the sorcerers and detectives Valkyrie Cain and Skulduggery Pleasant and numerous magic-wielding allies as they try to prevent Baron Vengeous and his forces from resurrecting the Grotesquery and returning the Faceless Ones to the world, it also is good for all magic lovers. The book did not see release in the US and Canada until 2018. HarperCollins Audio also publishes the unabridged CD sets of the books read by Rupert Degas.

In 2009, it won the award of Senior Irish Children's Book of the Year.

Plot summary

One year after the events of the first novel, Valkyrie Cain (formerly known as Stephanie Edgely) continues to work with Skulduggery Pleasant, an undead skeleton detective, capturing villains on the behalf of The Sanctuary, now ruled by Thurid Guild in a new location after the massacre in the previous Sanctuary.

Soon, Baron Vengeous (one of the original three Generals of the Elemental Mevolent) escapes his prison and begins searching for the armour of Lord Vile, another one of Mevolent's Generals with which he will be able to resurrect the Grotesquery, a hybrid monster made from a Faceless One's remains with the power bring back the Faceless Ones. Arriving in Ireland, he meets an accomplice - a vampire named Dusk who owed a debt to him. He orders Dusk to kidnap Valkyrie Cain. Dusk infects two humans to help him. Meanwhile, a skilled London woman named Tanith Low arrests Springheeled Jack after a fight.

After losing to Skulduggery Pleasant, Baron Vengeous goes after China Sorrows, who was once part of a cult that worshipped the Faceless Ones and also included Serpine and Vengous himself. The Baron confronts Sorrows in her apartment whilst Valkyrie is visiting. Valkyrie hides whilst China and Vengeous talk. Vengeous reveals that he was released from prison by an assassin named Billy-Ray Sanguine who promptly arrives along with Dusk. A battle ensues during which Valkyrie reveals herself and defends China. Valkyrie Cain is soon chased by Sanguine, who can travel through earth and buildings. After a struggle, Valkyrie is saved by Tanith Low. In the process, Valkyrie steals Billy-Ray Sanguine's straight razor.

Valkyrie and Skulduggery arrive at the Magician's village of Roarhaven to find a mysterious man called the Torment who has information they need about the Grotesquery. The Torment says he will only help them find the Grotesquery if Skulduggery kills Valkyrie, who is descended from the Ancients (whom the Torment despises as he thinks any usage of power will corrupt civilization). Skulduggery and Valkyrie trick the Torment by shooting a magical Reflection of Valkryie. The Torment is satisfied and tells Skulduggery the whereabouts of the Grotesquery. He and Valkyrie go to Bancrook Castle to find the Grotesquery, but Vengeous's minions have already obtained it. Soon after, Skulduggery and Valkyrie take the reflection back to Valkyrie's house. Valkyrie touches the mirror to absorb its memories and remembers what it is like to be shot. Valkyrie then notices that whenever she tries to look back in her memories one part always remains blank and she cannot pin it down. She realizes that her reflection hid something from her, and finds it disconcerting and dangerous. However, she goes on with Skulduggery without mentioning it to him.

Skulduggery and Valkyrie find Vengeous, Dusk, his Infected minions, and Sanguine with the Grotesquery. Soon after Vengeous sees him, Skulduggery shoots the Infected and has a fight with Vengeous, in which Vengeous wins, forcing Valkyrie to reveal she was with Skulduggery. On a chase to try to escape, Valkyrie is instead kidnapped by Sanguine who takes her to an old abandoned church to the Faceless Ones, where she is taken before the altar. Vengeous awaits her there, and cuts the palm of Valkyrie's hand, spilling her blood onto the Grotesquery's body before using the Armour's shadow powers which mingle with the blood. Skulduggery subsequently arrives and rescues Valkyrie. After stealing the Grotesquery, Valkyrie is incapacitated and wakes up in hospital. Skulduggery turns the lifeless Grotesquery over to the Sanctuary's top scientist, Kenspeckle Grouse, to take apart the hybrid. However, the Grotesquery has already absorbed a lot of power from Vile's armour and Valkyrie's blood and wakes up in the middle of the night whilst being operated on. He kills the Grouse's assistants and three guards, then goes after Valkyrie. Skulduggery and Tanith arrive and the three of them attack the Grotesquery before escaping. Meanwhile, members of Sanctuaries all across the world are being murdered by assassins to distract people from Vengeous's plan. Billy-Ray Sanguine has also released Springheeled Jack from prison and sends him after a Sanctuary official in London. Jack realizes that he is being manipulated by Vengeous in an attempt to bring back the Faceless Ones, and has a change of heart.

Skulduggery works out that Vengeous is actually a pawn in someone else's plan and accuses Thurid Guild of being in league with this mystery benefactor. In a rage, Guild fires Skulduggery who decides to go after Vengeous anyway. Valkyrie begrudgingly goes to her family reunion as a distraction to Dusk. The Torment meanwhile has discovered that Valkyrie is alive and goes after her only to be confronted by Skulduggery and Tanith Low. The Torment transforms into a giant spider but Skulduggery and Tanith defeat him nevertheless. Valkyrie is subsequently attacked by vampires and forced to flee. Dusk corners her and vows that when he has transformed her into a vampire he's going to set her loose on her parents while in her bloodlust. Valkyrie stabs Dusk in the leg with the syringe he uses to curb his vampiric side whilst he is transforming and as a result, he is caught between vampire and human and put in intense pain. Springheeled Jack arrives and defeats Dusk.

Meanwhile, China is attacked by Vengeous in an underground car park. The dark sorcerer, with Lord Vile's Armour, murders China's bodyguards, then beats her unconscious before taking her to Clearwater Hospital, his headquarters. Accompanied by Tanith Low, Mr. Bliss and some Cleavers, Skulduggery and Valkyrie go to Clearwater Hospital and battle with the Grotesquery which due to being part Faceless One is virtually invincible. Mr. Bliss is incapacitated but the Cleavers mercilessly attack the Grotesquery and almost overpower it when Vengeous arrives along with China whom he has taken captive and together with the Grotesquery he kills the Cleavers and puts some other Cleavers and Tanith Low into unconsciousness using a Necromancy wave. He then beats Skulduggery and Valkyrie into submission. Valkyrie tricks Vengous into releasing her, saying that she will join him but she releases China who attacks Vengeous and the Grotesquery, giving Valkyrie time to free Skulduggery who joins in the assault against Vengeous, tearing off his helmet and his breastplate before shooting him in the stomach. As punishment for failing, the Grotesquery breaks Vengeous' neck. The Torment subsequently arrives as a reinforcement and tries to kill the Grotesquery but he is defeated and scalped. In the ensuing battle, Valkyrie uses Tanith's sword to stab the Grotesquery through the heart, killing it. But before it dies it utters a terrible scream, signaling the Faceless Ones where Earth is before it dies.

Sanguine is then seen meeting his mysterious master who reveals that he had never expected the Grotesquery to succeed but he knew that when it was vanquished, the beast's dying scream would alert the Faceless One's spirits as to the whereabouts of the Earth meaning that all he has to do now is open the door. The mysterious man then pays Sanguine and takes his leave.

Valkyrie is later seen talking to Skulduggery on a pier. They must find out who Vengeous and Sanguine were really working for and if Thurid Guild is in league with him. Skulduggery ominously tells Valkyrie "Bad things are coming." They are subsequently attacked by a vampire and the book ends with them going into battle once again.

Characters

Valkyrie Cain

Skulduggery Pleasant

Baron Vengeous
A war criminal and one of Mevolent's top generals, he was determined to bring the Faceless Ones back into earth.

Billy-Ray Sanguine
The eyeless straight razor-baring William Raymond "Billy-Ray" Sanguine breaks Vengeous out of prison using his digging abilities.

Dusk
The vampire known as Dusk reluctantly works with Vengeous in order to pay back a long-standing debt he is owed by him.

The Grotesquery
The Grotesquery is a fusion of the remains of a Faceless One and several other creatures capable of opening the portal for them to come back, provided it is active around the time of a lunar eclipse, built with the intent of resurrecting the Faceless One whose remains are a part of it, brought back using a combination of Lord Vile's armour and Valkyrie Cain's blood.

Kenspeckle Grouse
Kenspeckle Grouse, described as a cranky old man, is a doctor who fixes Skulduggery's and Valkyrie's injuries and continually lectures them both about Skulduggery's decision to train Valkyrie. Despite his disapproval, he has a soft spot for Valkyrie, strongly expressing his dislike for Skulduggery in his presence.

Reviews

Skulduggery Pleasant: Playing with Fire has opened to largely positive reviews by critics.
 Jill Murphy (The Book Bag)
The continuing adventures of the skeleton detective and his sidekick are as full of action and terrible one liners as ever. There's a line of wry humour in these books which raise them way above the average bar.

 Fergus (Squishy Minnie):
All in all, I feel as though I could talk for five hours about this novel. It was a complete success, and I enjoyed every moment of it. Skulduggery is hilarious, Valkyrie is completely strong in both a physical and mental sense, and the perfect combination of humour, heart and horror cements Playing with Fire as my favourite Skulduggery Pleasant novel to date.
 Nathan Nicholls (Whitby Gazette):
The plot speeds along amid a whirl of chases, last-tick rescues, one high casualty melée after another and plenty of snappy, hard-boiled dialogue. Landy gives the term “deadpan humor” a whole new meaning; readers who prefer their heroes laconic and their action nonstop are in for a wild ride.
 Marya Jansen-Gruber (Through the Looking Glass):
The action is fast paced, the characters reveal interesting facts about themselves as the story unfolds, and readers will be hard pressed to find a more unique and surprising book.
 Karissa (Hidden In Pages):
If you are looking for a fast-paced, humorous, dark fantasy read I would recommend checking this out. It's a fun read with some neat magic in it.

Awards
In 2009, Skulduggery Pleasant: Playing with Fire was awarded the title of Irish Senior Children's Book of the Year.

References

External links

Skulduggery Pleasant UK, Australia and New Zealand Official Website
Skulduggery Pleasant US and Canada Official Website

2008 Irish novels
Irish fantasy novels
Skulduggery Pleasant books
HarperCollins books
2008 children's books